The 1978–79 Honduran Segunda División was the 12th season of the Honduran Segunda División.  Under the management of Luis Maradiaga, C.A. Portuario won the tournament after defeating C.D. Federal in the final series and obtained promotion to the 1979–80 Honduran Liga Nacional.

Final

 Portuario won 3–1 on aggregate.

References

Segunda
1978